Haughley (pronounced Hor-lee) is a rare English surname that is considered to originate from the ancient village and parish of Haughley in Suffolk. The village may have derived its name from the Old English and Scots term 'Haugh', referring to a low-lying meadow in a river valley, though equally it may have originated from the Old Norse 'Haugr' meaning hill or mound. It was first recorded within a territorial designation, that of Henry of Essex, lord of Raleigh and Haughley during the reign of King Stephen of England and Henry II of England. 

As the name has the same sound as the more common surname of Hawley, and as the spelling of English surnames was very variable until at least the 19th century, the two are likely to be related in many cases.

See also
 Haughley Castle

Surnames
English toponymic surnames